Siphonophrentis gigantea is an extinct species of giant rugose coral. It lived during the Middle Devonian period of the Paleozoic era.

Paleoecology 
Siphonophrentis gigantea was aquatic, like all coral. It is part of the phylum Cnidaria, and possessed a polyp that lived inside of its calyx. It had a limestone skeleton (the only part that survives fossilization) covered with soft tissue, and would have anchored themselves by the apical end  to the sea bed, while the tentacles of the polyp caught prey.

According to one study, Siphonophrentis gigantea may have been a deep-water species of coral. The limestone matrix of one specimen was tested for calcium carbonate, which is made up of microfossils. This would indicate that the matrix was rich in nutrients when the rock was formed, meaning it was likely in deep water where nutrients are more plentiful. Because of this, the species likely had no association with Zooxanthellae (a microorganism that has a symbiotic relationship with most extant coral), and therefore was likely colorless and unable to photosynthesize.

This study also indicated that this species grew upwards at a rate of approximately  every 399 days (a year in the Devonian).

References 

Rugosa
Devonian cnidarians
Paleozoic animals of North America
Fossils of the United States
Paleontology in New York (state)
Fossil taxa described in 1830